The 2019–20 FC Tambov season was their first season in the Russian Premier League, the highest tier of association football in Russia.

Season review
On 19 October, Aleksandr Grigoryan left his role as manager by mutual consent, with assistant manager Sergei Pervushin being appointed as Caretaker manager on 21 October.

On 4 February, Tambov confirmed that their home games for the second half of the season would be played at the Nizhny Novgorod Stadium in Nizhny Novgorod.

On 17 March, the Russian Premier League postponed all league fixtures until April 10 due to the COVID-19 pandemic.

On 1 April, the Russian Football Union extended the suspension of football until 31 May.

On 15 May, the Russian Football Union announced that the Russian Premier League season would resume on 21 June.

On 1 June, Khetag Khosonov and Miguel Cardoso left the club after their loan deals had expired.

On 16 July, the Russian Premier League announced that that day's game between Tambov and Sochi would not take place due to an outbreak of COVID-19 within the Sochi squad. On 21 July 2020, the Russian Football Union awarded the game 3–0 to Tambov.

Squad

Out on loan

Transfers

In

Loans in

Out

Loans out

Released

Friendlies

Competitions

Premier League

Results by round

Results

League table

Russian Cup

Squad statistics

Appearances and goals

|-
|colspan="14"|Players away from the club on loan:

|-
|colspan="14"|Players who appeared for Tambov but left during the season:

|}

Goal scorers

Clean sheets

Disciplinary record

References

FC Tambov seasons
Tambov